The 1952 Tennessee A&I Tigers football team was an American football team that represented Tennessee Agricultural & Industrial State College as a member of the Midwest Athletic Association (MAA) during the 1952 college football season. In their ninth season under head coach Henry Kean, the Tigers compiled an 8–2 record and outscored opponents by a total of 255 to 77. The Dickinson System rated Tennessee A&I as the No. 4 black college football team for 1952 with a score of 24.43, behind only Florida A&M (25.57), Virginia State (24.57), and Lincoln of Missouri (24.51). The team played its home games in Nashville, Tennessee.

Schedule

References

Tennessee A&I
Tennessee State Tigers football seasons
Tennessee A&I Tigers